Janja Čanjevac (born 14 November 2000) is a Croatian footballer who plays as a defender for Hajduk and the Croatia women's national team.

International career
Čanjevac made her senior debut for Croatia on 27 July 2017. She also played for the team during the UEFA Women's Euro 2022 qualifying.

References

External links
Janja Čanjevac at Croatian Football Federation

2000 births
Living people
Croatian women's footballers
Women's association football defenders
ŽNK Dinamo Zagreb players
ŽNK Split players
ŽNK Mura players
Croatia women's international footballers
Croatian expatriate women's footballers
Croatian expatriate sportspeople in Slovenia
Expatriate women's footballers in Slovenia